Iñaki Antón González (August 3, 1964), also known by his stage name Uoho, is a Spanish musician, songwriter and record producer. He was the lead guitarist of Platero y Tú, and now is a member of Extremoduro and his solo project, Inconscientes.

Biography
Iñaki Antón González was born on August 3, 1964 in Bilbao. He spent his youth at Zabala (Bilbao), where he met his Platero y Tú bandmates. He started with classical music learning piano. At 14 or 15 years old started to listen to classic rock bands such as Deep Purple or Status Quo and at 17 or 18 he learned to play guitar self-taught.
He started playing with Juantxu Olano in a band called Ke and they recorded a four songs demo tape. In 1989 Antón joined Juantxu, Jesús García and Fito Cabrales and they formed Platero y Tú. He also started a collaboration with the band Extremoduro and from 1996 he joined them too. In 2001 Antón, Fito and Roberto Iniesta formed the supergroup Extrechinato y Tú along with poet Manolo Chinato. The following year, Fito gave an interview to the press and he confirmed that he left Platero y Tú, and consequently the group disbanded.
He created the record label Muxik along with Robe in 2006. Antón also formed another band called Inconscientes that year and released a studio album in 2007 under his own label, Muxik.

Discography

Platero y Tú
 Voy a Acabar Borracho, (1991), Welcome Records. Reedited by DRO in 1996.
 Burrock'n Roll, (1992), DRO.
 Muy Deficiente, (1992), DRO.
 Vamos Tirando, (1993), DRO.
 Hay Poco Rock & Roll, (1994), DRO
 A Pelo, (1996), DRO
 7, (1997), DRO
 Correos, (2000), DRO
 Hay Mucho Rock'n Roll, Volumen I (2002) and Volumen II (2005), DRO

Extremoduro
 Pedrá, (1995)
 Agila, (1996)
 Iros Todos a Tomar por Culo, (1997) (Live Album)
 Canciones Prohibidas, (1998)
 Yo, Minoría Absoluta, (2002)
 Grandes Éxitos y Fracasos, Episodio I (2004) and Episodio II (2005) (Compilation Album)
 La Ley Innata (2008)
 Material Defectuoso (2011)
 Para Todos los Públicos (2013)

Extrechinato y Tú
 Poesía Básica (2001), Dro.

Inconscientes
 La Inconsciencia de Uoho, (2007), Muxik.
 Quimeras y otras realidades, (2016), El Dromedario Records.
 No somos viento, (2018), El Dromedario Records.

Career as record producer

Extremoduro 
Rock transgresivo (1994, along with Extremoduro)
Agila (1996)
Iros todos a tomar por culo (1997)
Canciones prohibidas (1998)
Yo, minoría absoluta (2002)
Grandes éxitos y fracasos (Episodio primero) (2004)
Grandes éxitos y fracasos (Episodio segundo) (2004)
La ley innata (2008)
Material defectuoso (2011)
Para todos los públicos (2013)

Marea
Besos de perro (2003)

Chorra 'n Rock
En peligro de extinción (2003)

Afónicos Perdidos
Sin dar marcha atrás (2004)

Fito and Fitipaldis
A puerta cerrada (1998)
Los sueños locos (2001)
Lo más lejos a tu lado (2003)

Despistaos
Lejos (2006)

Doctor Deseo
 Sexo, ternura y misterio (2008)

Memoria de Pez
 En el mar de los sueños (2008)

Forraje
Retales de vino y luna (2009)

Gatibu
Zoramena (2002)
Disko Infernu (2005)
Laino Guztien Gainetik, Sasi Guztien Azpitik (2008)

James Room
Bulletman (2020)
Chocolate Jesus (2020)
Comin' Down (2020)

References

External links
Platero y Tú interview
Platero y tú Official Website
ExtremoduroOfficial Website
Inconscientes Official Website 
Muxik Official Website 

Extremoduro
1964 births
Living people
Spanish guitarists
Spanish male guitarists
Basque musicians